Zir Ab (Persian transliteration: Zīr Āb) is a village in the Razavi Khorasan Province in the north-east of Iran. The next larger city is Sabzevar.

References

Populated places in Razavi Khorasan Province